Kendall Robert Gammon (born October 23, 1968) is a former American football long snapper and center who played for three teams in the National Football League (NFL). In 2004, Gammon was the first pure long snapper to be selected for the Pro Bowl. Gammon served as the analyst for the Kansas City Chiefs radio broadcasts until 2019.

College career
Gammon attended Pittsburg State University, where he was a captain of the football team his junior and senior year. He played tight end, offensive tackle, guard and also handled the long snaping. In 1991, Gammon was a part of the team coached by Chuck Broyles that won the Division II National Championship.

NFL career
Gammon was drafted 291st overall in the 1992 NFL draft by the Pittsburgh Steelers. For the Steelers, he was the long snapper and backup center from 1992 to 1995.

After spending four years with the New Orleans Saints, Gammon signed with the Chiefs as a free agent in February 2000. He was named to the Pro Bowl in 2005 as a special teams player, long snapping for the AFC team. Gammon was the first pure long snapper to be selected for the Pro Bowl.

Gammon played in 218 consecutive games and appeared in Super Bowl XXX with the Pittsburgh Steelers in 1995.

After the NFL
In January 2008, Gammon returned to Pittsburg State, in Pittsburg, Kansas. He serves as the university’s Director of Development for Intercollegiate Athletics.

Gammon was the co-owner of Paradise Nursery, a retail/wholesale distributor of nursery products in Kansas City, which was sold in 2013.

Gammon has written two books, Life's a Snap: Building on the Past to Improve Your Future and Game Plan: Leadership Lessons from the Best of the NFL.

Gammon was on-air talent for the Chiefs Radio Network from 2008–2020, ending as the game color analyst.

Personal life
Gammon married his college sweetheart while attending Pittsburg State. His son Blaise graduated from Kansas State where he played tight end.

References

1968 births
Living people
American Conference Pro Bowl players
American football long snappers
Kansas City Chiefs announcers
Kansas City Chiefs players
National Football League announcers
New Orleans Saints players
People from Butler County, Kansas
Pittsburg State Gorillas football players
Pittsburgh Steelers players